Pontian may refer to:
 Pope Pontian (died 235), 3rd-century Catholic Pope
 Pontian Greeks, a group of ethnic Greeks traditionally from the Pontus and Pontic Mountains regions in northern Turkey
 Pontian Islands, a group of islands on the coast of Italy
 Pontian District, a district and city in Johor, Malaysia
 Pontian (federal constituency)
 Pontian Kechil or Pontian Town
 Pontian, the uppermost Miocene Paratethys stage, coeval with the Messinian

See also
 Ponciano (disambiguation)
 Pons (disambiguation)
 Pontian Selatan (federal constituency) (1959–1974), Johor, Malaysia
 Pontian Utara (federal constituency) (1959–1974), Johor, Malaysia
 Pontianus (disambiguation)
 Pontic (disambiguation)
 Pontine (disambiguation)